Amine Megateli (born 4 May 1987) is an Algerian footballer who is currently playing for Algerian Ligue Professionnelle 1 club ES Sétif. Although he plays primarily as a right-back, he has been used as a centre-back, left-back and central midfielder.

Honours 

 Algerian Cup (1): 2008
 CAF Champions League (1): 2014
 CAF Super Cup (1): 2015

References

External links
 
 

1987 births
Living people
People from Médéa
Algerian footballers
ES Sétif players
JSM Béjaïa players
Algerian Ligue Professionnelle 1 players
Olympique de Médéa players
Association football defenders
21st-century Algerian people